Grevillea obtecta, commonly known as Fryerstown grevillea, Elphinstone grevillea or Taradale grevillea, is a species of flowering plant in the family Proteaceae and is endemic to Victoria in Australia. It is a prostrate, clumping or straggling shrub with pinnatifid, pinnatipartite or toothed leaves, and toothbrush-like clusters of light green to yellowish and purplish to black flowers with a dull yellow to pink style.

Description

Taxonomy
Grevillea obtecta was first formally described in 1985 by Bill Molyneux in the journal Muelleria from specimens collected near Taradale in 1977. The specific epithet (obtecta) means "covered over" or "protected", referring to the large bracts that cover and protect the immature flowers.

Distribution and habitat
Fryerstown grevillea occurs in dry sclerophyll forest between Fryerstown and the north of Daylesford. It is found on the south faces of gravelly slopes.

Conservation status
This species is listed as "endangered" under the Victorian Government Flora and Fauna Guarantee Act 1988 and as "Rare in Victoria" on the Department of Sustainability and Environment's Advisory List of Rare Or Threatened Plants In Victoria.

References

External links
Herbarium specimen at Royal Botanic Gardens Kew

obtecta
Flora of Victoria (Australia)
Proteales of Australia
Plants described in 1985